Theodore F. Brophy (1923 - 2020) was an American businessman and telecommunications professional. He joined GTE in 1958, became the president in 1972, and the chairman and chief executive officer in 1976.

While chairman and chief executive officer of GTE, he strongly opposed trade protectionism and he took steps to reduce threat of a corporate raid or "greenmailing".

In August 1988, President Ronald Reagan appointed him as an ambassador while serving as the chairman of a United States delegation for radio and satellite space communications during an international conference. In October 1985, President Reagan also appointed him Chairman of the President's National Security Telecommunications Advisory Committee for a period of one year. He served on the committee 1986–88.

Throughout his career, he held various board and trustee positions.

Early life and education
Brophy was born on August 23, 1923 in New York City, New York. He graduated from Kent School, Kent, Connecticut in 1941, Yale University in 1944 and Harvard Law School in 1949. He served in the United States Navy from 1944 to 1946 and was on the submarine USS Cabezon (SS-334) in the South Pacific during World War II. While in the Navy, he rose to the rank of lieutenant (junior grade).

Early career
He worked for the law firm Root, Ballantine, Harlan, Bushby and Palmer from 1949 to 1955. He was general counsel for the Lummus Company from 1955 to 1958.

Later life
Brophy died August 3, 2020 in Florida.

References

1923 births
2020 deaths
20th-century American lawyers
Ambassadors of the United States
American telecommunications industry businesspeople
Businesspeople from Greenwich, Connecticut
Harvard Law School alumni
Kent School alumni
United States Navy officers
Yale University alumni